Alfina Nassyrova (Russian: Альфина Насырова; born 11 June 1988) is a Kazakh model who won the national pageant Miss Kazakhstan in 2007 held at the Abai State Kazakh National Opera & Ballet Theatre in Almaty. She went on to represent Kazakhstan in Miss Universe 2008 in Nha Trang, Vietnam, on 14 July 2008, and Miss World 2008 in Johannesburg, South Africa, on 13 December 2008. She was not placed in Miss Universe, but she was among the Top 15 in Miss World.

She studied textile and manufacturing at the Almaty Technological University.

References

External links
 Instagram of Alfina Nassyrova

1988 births
Living people
Kazakhstani female models
Miss World 2008 delegates
Miss Universe 2008 contestants
Kazakhstani beauty pageant winners
People from Almaty
Miss Kazakhstan winners